San Andrés  may refer to:

St Andrew (disambiguation), a number of Catholic saints

Places

Argentina 
 San Andrés (Buenos Aires), city located in General San Martín Partido, in the northern zone of Greater Buenos Aires
 San Andrés de Giles, Buenos Aires Province

Belize 
 San Andrés, Belize, a village in the Corozal District

Bolivia 
 San Andrés, Marbán
 San Andrés Municipality, Beni

Canary Islands 
 San Andrés, Santa Cruz de Tenerife
 San Andrés y Sauces

Colombia 
 Archipelago of San Andrés, Providencia and Santa Catalina, a department
 San Andrés (island), an island in that department
 San Andrés, San Andrés y Providencia, capital of that department
 San Andrés, Antioquia
 San Andrés–Providencia Creole

El Salvador 
 San Andrés, El Salvador, an archaeological site in southwestern El Salvador

Guatemala 
 San Andrés, El Petén
 San Andrés Itzapa, Chimaltenango
 San Andrés Sajcabajá, El Quiché
 San Andrés Semetabaj, Sololá
 San Andrés Villa Seca, Retalhuleu
 San Andrés Xecul, Totonicapán

Honduras 
 San Andrés, Lempira

Mexico 
 San Andrés, Chihuahua
 San Andrés Cholula, Puebla 
 San Andrés Cohamiata, Jalisco
 San Andrés Duraznal, Chiapas
 San Andrés Larráinzar, Chiapas
 San Andrés de la Cal, Morelos
 San Andrés Tuxtla, Veracruz
 San Andrés (Mesoamerican site), Tabasco, an Olmec archaeological site

Oaxaca 
San Andrés Cabecera Nueva	
San Andrés Dinicuiti	
San Andrés Huaxpaltepec
San Andrés Huayapam	
San Andrés Ixtlahuaca	
San Andrés Lagunas	
San Andrés Nuxiño
San Andrés Paxtlan	
San Andrés Sinaxtla	
San Andrés Solaga
San Andrés Teotilalpam	
San Andrés Tepetlapa	
San Andrés Yaá
San Andrés Yutatío	
San Andrés Zabache	
San Andrés Zautla

Panama
San Andrés, Chiriquí

Peru 
 San Andrés District, subdivision in Pisco, Ica Region

Philippines 
 San Andres, Catanduanes
 San Andres, Manila
 San Andres, Quezon
 San Andres, Romblon

Spain 
San Andrés (Madrid)
San Andrés, Santa Cruz de Tenerife

Trinidad and Tobago 
 Fort San Andres

United States 
 San Andres Mountains, a mountain range in New Mexico

Churches
 San Andrés, Calatayud, a church in Aragon, Spain
 San Andrés, Alcalá del Júcar, a church in Castilla-La Mancha, Spain

Educational institutions 
 Colegio San Andrés, a Peruvian high school located in Lima
 Higher University of San Andrés,  a university in Bolivia
 University of San Andrés, a university in Argentina

Ships 
 ARC San Andres (BO 151), a survey ship in the Colombian Navy, formerly the USS Rockville, a PCE-842-class patrol vessel in the US Navy
 ARC San Andres (PO-45), a buoy-tender in the Colombian Navy, formerly the USCGC Gentian (WLB-290)

See also
 San Andrés Accords, Mexico
 St Andrews (disambiguation)
 San Andreas (disambiguation)